Seynes is a commune in the Gard department in southern France.

Population

Sport
Sport climbing cliff made famous by the continuous limestone tufa formations.

See also
Communes of the Gard department

References

External links

 Rock Climbing Topo / Guide of Seynes

Communes of Gard